"Out of Time" is a 1988 single by Noel.  The single was his second and last entry at the number-one position and was on the chart for ten weeks.  Both of Noel's number-one dance hits came in 1988.  Unlike Noel's previous releases, "Out of Time" did not place on any other charts.

Track listing

US 12" single

Charts

Weekly charts

Year-end charts

References

Noel Pagan songs
1988 singles
Song recordings produced by Robert Clivillés
Songs written by Ish Ledesma
4th & B'way Records singles
1987 songs
Songs written by Robert Clivillés